White Elephant Butte is a summit in the U.S. state of Nevada.

White Elephant Butte was so named on account of the summit's color and outline.

References

Mountains of Elko County, Nevada